John Jarvis Seabrook (April 12, 1899 – May 1, 1975) was an African-American pastor and president-emeritus of Huston–Tillotson University.  He died May 1, 1975, while arguing before the Austin City Council on the naming of Austin's MLK Jr. Boulevard (formerly "19th Street").  In East Austin, east of Interstate 35 (a region historically populated primarily by minorities), the street was to be named MLK Jr. Blvd; west of I-35, it would remain 19th Street.  Dr. Seabrook wanted there to be a single name in both East and West Austin.  While speaking to the council of the need to unite the city, Dr. Seabrook collapsed, suffering a fatal heart attack.

On May 15, 2010, the same council approved naming of the MLK Jr. Boulevard bridge over I-35 after Seabrook. A $55,000 scholarship at Huston–Tillotson University has also been set up in Seabrook's name, $55,000 being the proposed cost of changing the road signs on the former 19th street to MLK Boulevard in 1975. This cost was one of the arguments at the time against changing the name of the road.

References 

1899 births
1975 deaths
Huston–Tillotson University alumni